Bianca Ahrens (born 9 January 1991) is a German  water polo player, playing at the goalkeeper position. She is part of the Germany women's national water polo team.

She competed at the 2012 Women's European Water Polo Championship, 2016 Women's European Water Polo Championship, 2011 FINA Women's Water Polo World League,

References 

1991 births
Living people